Arene tamsiana is a species of sea snail, a marine gastropod mollusk in the family Areneidae.

Description

The shell can grow to be 4.4 mm in length.

Distribution
Arene tamsiana can be found from Venezuela to The Grenadines.

References

External links
 To Encyclopedia of Life
 To World Register of Marine Species

Areneidae
Gastropods described in 1852